is a Japanese former footballer who played Midfielder.

Career 
Tidak announcement officially retirement from football after eight years at professional career on 26 December 2022.

Career statistics

Club 
Updated to the end 2022 season.

References

External links
Profile at Machida Zelvia

1991 births
Living people
Ritsumeikan University alumni
Association football people from Ōita Prefecture
Japanese footballers
J2 League players
J3 League players
FC Machida Zelvia players
Kataller Toyama players
Okinawa SV players
Association football midfielders